Ivan Marković (born 20 June 1994) is a Serbian footballer who plays as a midfielder for Zob Ahan.

Career

Early career
Born in Belgrade, Marković began playing football in the youth team of Red Star Belgrade before joined Zemun. He made his Zemun first team debut on 15 June 2011 at 16 years 360 days, in a 1–2 loss against Novi Pazar for Serbian First League, coming on as a substitute for Konstantin Stegnjajić at half-time.

After a short spell in the VVV-Venlo's youth academy, Marković joined Partizan in 2012. In January 2013, Ivan left Partizan to join the Polish side Korona Kielce, but failed to make a single league appearance in one year.

CSKA Sofia
On 22 February 2014 after a short trial period, Marković signed a two-and-half-year contract with CSKA Sofia. He made his debut in the Bulgarian A Group on 15 March in the Eternal derby of Bulgarian football against Levski Sofia, playing 57 minutes. On 21 April, in his second participation in the Eternal derby, he scored his first league goal for CSKA, netting the 3rd for a 3–1 win.

In pre-season training for the 2014–15 season, Marković ruptured his anterior cruciate ligament and received surgery on 22 July 2014. His recovery was said to take up to six months.

Cherno More Varna
On 28 January he signed for Cherno More coming from Levadiakos.

Career statistics

Club

Personal life
His brother, Vanja Marković, is also a footballer who currently plays for Persiraja Banda Aceh in Liga 1.

References

External links

1994 births
Living people
Footballers from Belgrade
Serbian footballers
Association football midfielders
FK Zemun players
FK Voždovac players
PFC CSKA Sofia players
Levadiakos F.C. players
PFC Cherno More Varna players
Gyeongnam FC players
FK Radnik Surdulica players
AFC Eskilstuna players
Kalamata F.C. players
FK Rabotnički players
Serbian First League players
Serbian SuperLiga players
K League 2 players
Superettan players
First Professional Football League (Bulgaria) players
Macedonian First Football League players
Expatriate footballers in Poland
Expatriate footballers in Bulgaria
Expatriate footballers in Greece
Expatriate footballers in Sweden
Expatriate footballers in North Macedonia
Serbian expatriate sportspeople in Poland
Serbian expatriate sportspeople in Bulgaria
Serbian expatriate sportspeople in Greece
Serbian expatriate sportspeople in Sweden
Serbian expatriate sportspeople in North Macedonia
Expatriate footballers in Iran